Rolf Hertzog (born 25 April 1968) is a Swiss former professional tennis player.

Hertzog, a Zürich native, won four Swiss junior championship and had a win over Petr Korda at the junior French Open in 1986, where he reached the quarter-finals. He won the Port Washington international junior championships in 1987.

During the late 1980s he featured on the Grand Prix tennis circuit, where his appearances included a first round loss to Stefan Edberg at Basel in 1986 and a win over Paolo Canè to make the second round at Gstaad in 1988. He was a doubles finalist partnering Marc Walder at the 1988 Bologna Open.

Grand Prix finals

Doubles (0–1)

ATP Challenger finals

Doubles: 1 (0–1)

References

External links
 
 

1968 births
Living people
Swiss male tennis players
Tennis players from Zürich